The first season of the American comedy television series Silicon Valley premiered in the United States on HBO on April 6, 2014. It consists of eight episodes, and concluded on June 1, 2014.

Silicon Valley follows a group of young men working on a startup company in Silicon Valley, California. The first season introduces the characters of Richard Hendricks (Thomas Middleditch), Erlich Bachman (T.J. Miller), Nelson "Big Head" Bighetti (Josh Brener), Bertram Gilfoyle (Martin Starr), Dinesh Chugtai (Kumail Nanjiani), and Jared Dunn (Zach Woods), who work together to create an app called Pied Piper, which is the result of Hendricks' development of a data compression algorithm.

The season received positive reviews from critics.

Cast

Main 
 Thomas Middleditch as Richard Hendricks
 T.J. Miller as Erlich Bachman
 Josh Brener as Nelson "Big Head" Bighetti
 Martin Starr as Bertram Gilfoyle
 Kumail Nanjiani as Dinesh Chugtai
 Christopher Evan Welch as Peter Gregory
 Amanda Crew as Monica Hall
 Zach Woods as Donald "Jared" Dunn

Recurring
 Matt Ross as Gavin Belson
 Jimmy O. Yang as Jian-Yang
 Ben Feldman as Ron LaFlamme
 Bernard White as Denpok, a guru
 Andy Daly as Doctor
 Aly Mawji as Aly Dutta
 Scott Prendergast as Scott
 Jill E. Alexander as Patrice
 Brian Tichnell as Jason

Episodes

Reception

Critical response 
On Metacritic, the first season has a score of 84 out of 100 based on 36 reviews, indicating "universal acclaim". Similarly, Rotten Tomatoes presented the first season with a 95% "Certified Fresh" rating and an average score of 7.94 out of 10 based on 57 reviews, with the critical consensus "Silicon Valley is a relevant, often hilarious take on contemporary technology and the geeks who create it that benefits from co-creator Mike Judge's real-life experience in the industry."

Tim Goodman of The Hollywood Reporter said "HBO finds its best and funniest full-on comedy in years with this Mike Judge creation, and it may even tap into that most elusive thing, a wide audience." Matt Roush of TV Guide said "The deft, resonant satire that helped make Judge's Office Space a cult hit takes on farcical new dimension in Silicon Valley, which introduces a socially maladroit posse of computer misfits every bit the comic equal of The Big Bang Theorys science nerds." Emily VanDerWerff of The A.V. Club said "It feels weirdly like a tech-world Entourage—and that's meant as more of a compliment than it seems." Brian Tallarico of RogerEbert.com praised the jokes of the series but commented on the slow progression of the character development in the first two episodes and the reliance on common stereotypes in technology, including "the nerd who can't even look at a girl much less talk to her or touch her, the young businessman who literally shakes when faced with career potential." He goes on to state that the lack of depth to the characters creates "this odd push and pull; I want the show to be more realistic but I don't care about these characters enough when it chooses to be so."

David Auerbach of Slate stated that the show did not go far enough to be called risky or a biting commentary of the tech industry. "Because I'm a software engineer, Silicon Valley might portray me with my pants up to my armpits, nerdily and nasally complaining that Thomas' compression algorithm is impossible or that nine times F in hexadecimal is 87, not 'fleventy five' (as Erlich says), but I would forgive such slips in a second if the show were funny." Auerbach claimed that he used to work for Google, and that his wife also worked for them at the time of the review.

Accolades 
At the 72nd Golden Globe Awards, the show was nominated for Best Series (Musical or Comedy). For the 66th Primetime Emmy Awards, the series received five nominations, including Outstanding Comedy Series, Outstanding Directing for a Comedy Series (Mike Judge for "Minimum Viable Product"), Outstanding Writing for a Comedy Series (Alec Berg for "Optimal Tip-to-Tip Efficiency"), Outstanding Art Direction for a Contemporary Program (Half-Hour or Less), and Outstanding Main Title Design.

Home media 
The first season was released on DVD and Blu-ray on March 31, 2015; bonus features include eight audio commentaries and three behind-the-scenes featurettes.

References

External links 
 
 

2014 American television seasons
Silicon Valley (TV series)